Daniel Ravier (born 17 March 1948 in Lyon) is a retired French professional football midfielder.

External links
 
 
 Profile on French federation official site 

1948 births
Living people
French footballers
France international footballers
Association football midfielders
Olympique Lyonnais players
Stade de Reims players
Ligue 1 players
Ligue 2 players
Footballers from Lyon
FC Villefranche Beaujolais players